Kokoda Barracks is an Australian Army base located in the Canungra Military Area near Witheren, Queensland. It is named after the Kokoda Track campaign during the Second World War.

The Australian Army Intelligence Corps has training facilities known as the Defence Intelligence Training Centre and the Australian Army Land Warfare Centre, Canungra located here.

See also
List of Australian military bases

Notes

References

Barracks in Australia
Military installations in Queensland